Junkie is a pejorative usually referring to a person with an addiction.

Entertainment and media
 Junkie (novel), a novel by William S. Burroughs

 "Junkie" (song), 2013 song by Medina featuring Svenstrup & Vendelboe 
 The Junkies, a radio program
 MMAjunkie, a mixed martial arts website
 "Junkie", a song by Ozzy Osbourne from Down To Earth
 "Junky", a song by Brockhampton from Saturation II

People
 Tom Holkenborg (born 1967), Dutch musician also known as Junkie XL